The Magical Music of Walt Disney is a 4-volume compilation album of Disney music and songs up through 1978, to coincide with the fiftieth anniversary of Mickey Mouse. However, it did not put The Adventures of Ichabod and Mr. Toad, Alice in Wonderland, The Aristocats, and Bedknobs and Broomsticks on the records.

Track listings

Volume One

Side A
1. Mickey Mouse Revue
Orchestra Tuning
Count-Off
Heigh-Ho
Whistle While You Work
When You Wish Upon a Star
Hi-Diddle-Dee-Dee
Mickey Mouse Alma Mater

2. Steamboat Willie
Turkey in the Straw

3. Mickey's Early Years (1929 – 1934)
Minnie's Yoo Hoo (Mickey's Follies)
In the Shade of the Old Apple Tree (The Delivery Boy)
St. Louis Blues (Blue Rhythm)
Maple Leaf Rag (The Whoopee Party)
Runnin' Wild (The Whoopee Party)
Who'll Buy a Box Lunch? (Building a Building)
Congratulations, Mr. Mickey Mouse (Mickey's Gala Premiere)
Sextette From "Lucia" (Orphan's Benefit)

4. Maestro Mickey Conducts (1935 – 1942)
William Tell Overture (The Band Concert)
Quartet From "Rigoletto" (Mickey's Grand Opera)
Light Cavalry Overture (Symphony Hour)

5. Three Little Pigs (1933)
Who's Afraid of the Big Bad Wolf?

Side B
1. Snow White and the Seven Dwarfs (1937)
One Song
I'm Wishing
With a Smile and a Song
Dig Dig Dig
Some Day My Prince Will Come
Heigh-Ho
Whistle While You Work
A Silly Song
One Song
Some Day My Prince Will Come (Reprise/Finale)

2. Fantasia (1940)
The Sorcerer's Apprentice

3. Pinocchio (1940)
Overture
When You Wish Upon a Star
Little Wooden Head
The Blue Fairy Appears
Give a Little Whistle
I've Got No Strings
Hi-Diddle-Dee-Dee
Whale Chase
Pinocchio Celebration
When You Wish Upon a Star (Reprise/Finale)

Volume Two

Side A
1. Dumbo (1941)
Overture
Look Out For Mr. Stork
Casey Jr.
Baby Mine
Pink Elephants On Parade
When I See An Elephant Fly
Dumbo's Triumph
When I See An Elephant Fly (Reprise/Finale)

2. Bambi (1942)
Opening Theme
Everybody Awake
The Little Prince
Love Is A Song
Thumper Theme
Little April Shower
Gallop Of The Stags
King Of The Forest
Love Is A Song
Man Is In The Forest
Let's Sing A Gay Little Spring Song
Sleepy Morning In The Woods
I Bring You A Song
Love Is A Song (Reprise)

3. Animated Classics of the 40s (1941 – 1948)
The Reluctant Dragon (The Reluctant Dragon, 1941)
Saludos Amigos (Saludos Amigos, 1943)
The Three Caballeros (The Three Caballeros, 1945)
You Belong To My Heart (The Three Caballeros, 1945)
Make Mine Music (Make Mine Music, 1946)
The Martins & The Coys (Make Mine Music, 1946)
Shortnin' Bread (Make Mine Music, 1946)
Fun And Fancy Free (Fun And Fancy Free, 1947)
Melody Time (Melody Time, 1948)
Little Toot (Melody Time, 1948)

Side B
1. Song of the South (1946)
Song of the South
Uncle Remus Said
Zip-A-Dee-Doo-Dah
Sooner Or Later
Ev'rybody Has A Laughing Place
Zip-A-Dee-Doo-Dah (Reprise)

2. Cinderella (1950)
Cinderella
A Dream Is A Wish Your Heart Makes
King's Remarks (Dialogue)
Oh Sweet Nightingale
The Work Song
Bibbidi-Bobbidi-Boo
So This Is Love
A Dream Is A Wish Your Heart Makes (Reprise)

3. Peter Pan (1953)
The Second Star To The Right
You Can Fly! You Can Fly! You Can Fly!
A Pirate's Life
Your Mother & Mine
You Can Fly! (Reprise/Finale)

Volume Three

Side A
1. Lady And The Tramp (1955)
Overture: Bella Notte
Peace On Earth
Loch Lomond
We Are Siamese (The Siamese Cat Song)
Bella Notte
Home Sweet Home
He's A Tramp
Peace On Earth (Finale)

2. Sleeping Beauty (1959)
Fanfare & Once Upon A Dream
Hail To Princess Aurora
Sleeping Beauty Song
I Wonder
Once Upon A Dream
Skumps
Sleeping Beauty Song
Once Upon A Dream (Reprise & Finale)

3. The Vanishing Prairie (1954)
Music From "The Vanishing Prairie"

Side B
1. The Later Animated Years (1961 – 1973)
Cruella De Ville (101 Dalmatians, 1961)
Sword In The Stone (Sword In The Stone, 1963)
Winnie The Pooh And The Honey Tree (Winnie The Pooh And The Honey Tree, 1966)
Winnie The Pooh (Winnie The Pooh And The Honey Tree, 1966)
Up, Down, Touch The Ground (Winnie The Pooh And The Honey Tree, 1966)
Rumbly In My Tumbly (Winnie The Pooh And The Honey Tree, 1966)
Little Black Rain Cloud (Winnie The Pooh And The Honey Tree, 1966)
Rumbly/Reprise & Winnie Finale (Winnie The Pooh And The Honey Tree, 1966)
Colonel Hathi's March (Jungle Book, 1967)
The Bare Necessities (Jungle Book, 1967)
I Wan'na Be Like You (Jungle Book, 1967)
Oo-De-Lally (Robin Hood, 1973)
Love (Robin Hood, 1973)
Love Goes On & Oo-De-Lally Finale (Robin Hood, 1973)

2. The Rescuers (1977)
The Journey
The Rescue Aid Society
Someone's Waiting For You
Tomorrow Is Another Day

Volume Four

Side A
1. Mary Poppins (1964)
Overture
Sister Suffragette
The Life I Lead
The Perfect Nanny
A Spoonful Of Sugar
Chim Chim Cher-ee
Jolly Holiday
Supercalifragilisticexpialidocious
Stay Awake
I Love To Laugh
The Life I Lead (A British Bank)
Feed The Birds
Fidelity Fiduciary Bank
Chim Chim Cher-ee
Step In Time
Let's Go Fly A Kite/Finale

Side B
1. Pete's Dragon (1977)
Brazzle Dazzle Day
I Saw A Dragon
It's Not Easy
Candle On The Water
Every Little Piece
Brazzle Dazzle Day (End Title)

2. Live Music From The Magic Kingdoms
"King Mickey" March (Walt Disney World Band)
The Coney Island Washboard (The Dapper Dans)
Minnie's Yoo Hoo (The Keystone Cops)
Maple Leaf Rag (The Main Street Pianist)
Swanee River (The Banjo Kings)
British Grenadiers (The Fife & Drum Corp)
Tennessee (The Blue Grass Boys)
America The Beautiful (Walt Disney World Band)

3. Music Of The Magic Kingdom Attractions
It's A Small World 
Yo Ho (A Pirate's Life For Me)
Grim Grinning Ghosts
The Tiki Tiki Tiki Room
The Ballad Of Davey Crockett (Country Bear Jamboree)
Yankee Doodle (America Sings)
Lincoln Dialogue And Battle Hymn Of The Republic (Hall Of Presidents)

Disney film soundtracks
Disney albums
1978 compilation albums
Soundtrack compilation albums